Isara picta, common name the brown mitre, is a species of sea snail, a marine gastropod mollusk in the family Mitridae, the miters or miter snails.

Description
The Isara picta is a snail with a cone shaped shell ranging in 20 – 40 mm in length. The color of the shell can range from deep brown to a light tan.

Distribution

References

External links
Isara picta, gastropods.com

Mitridae
Gastropods described in 1844